Mission Valley, San Diego is a wide river valley in San Diego, California, United States.

Mission Valley may refer to:

 Mission Valley Center (San Diego Trolley station)
 Westfield Mission Valley, shopping mall in San Diego
 Mission Valley (El Paso), Texas
 Mission Valley Elementary School in Fremont, California
 Mission Valley High School (Kansas)
 Mission Valley Athletic League, an East Bay sports league in the San Francisco Bay Area